William Loeb III (December 26, 1905 – September 14, 1981) was publisher of the Manchester Union Leader newspaper (later The New Hampshire Union Leader) in Manchester, New Hampshire, for thirty-five years from 1946 until his death. His unyieldingly conservative political views helped to make The Union Leader one of the best-known small papers in the country. The publication benefited from nationwide attention every four years during the New Hampshire primary.

Early years
Loeb was born on December 26, 1905, in Washington, D.C., the son of Catharine/Katherine Wilhelmina (Dorr) and William Loeb Jr. (1866–1937). His parents were both of German descent.

His father was executive secretary to Theodore Roosevelt, and a nationally known figure in his own day. Loeb's grandfather was William Loeb, I, a German immigrant. Loeb's siblings were Louisa Loeb-Neudorf, Amelia Olive Loeb and Lillian May Loeb.

Young Loeb attended The Hotchkiss School and Williams College, and soon met and married Elizabeth Nagy, a faculty member at nearby Smith College. They were married on May 29, 1926. Nagy was eight years older than Loeb, and his parents objected to the matrimony. Loeb's father excluded him from his will in light of the marriage. The couple divorced six years later on October 11, 1932, and Loeb received alimony from Nagy for several years. Later in his life, Loeb made efforts to hide the marriage, and records of the divorce (Loeb v. Loeb F-3144) were found missing at the time they were to be archived on microfiche.

Career
Loeb partnered with his friend Charlie Weaver to buy the St. Albans Messenger in St. Albans, Vermont, in 1941 to enter the publishing arena. Loeb also received cash investments from a woman named Marka Loening, who indulged in an extramarital affair with Loeb while waiting for her divorce from her estranged husband to be finalized. Loeb later used funding from Loening to buy the Burlington Daily News in 1942. One of Loeb's first infamous journalistic exploits was the publishing of his own baptismal certificate on the front page of both Vermont papers in an attempt to disprove rumors of his Jewish ancestry.

Loeb cited ulcers for his medical exemption from service during World War II, allegedly drinking large quantities of alcohol before doctor's visits to ensure flare-ups.

In 1946, Loeb secured funding from Ridder Publications to buy the Manchester Union and the Evening Leader from Annie Reid Knox, the widow of former Navy Secretary William Franklin Knox. Mrs. Knox later regretted the sale, claiming she had not seen how Loeb handled his Vermont newspapers, and claiming that Loeb did not mention the involvement of the Ridder family. Loeb used $250,000 in funding from his mother's accounts to fund the purchase of his share in the papers, and in 1948 used an additional $300,000 to buy out other shareholders and gain complete control of the papers, which he then merged into the Union Leader.

In 1947, Loeb brought in investor Leonard Finder as a business partner in the paper. Marka Loening, increasingly resentful of the presence of Scripps-Howard heiress Elizabeth "Nackey" Scripps-Gallowhur in the newspaper offices, withdrew her interests in Loeb's papers that same year. Loeb's mother had been under the impression that he and Loening were to be married, but discovered upon Loening's departure that Loeb had been secretly married to Vermont resident Eleanore McAllister since 1942. Afterwards, Loeb publicly disclosed the marriage in his papers, but claimed it had taken place in 1947 and not 1942.

Meanwhile, new competition emerged in Manchester with the return of Bernard J. "B.J." McQuaid, a former Manchester Union reporter under the tenure of Colonel Knox, from military service in Europe. McQuaid founded a rival paper, The New Hampshire Sunday News, with his brother, Elias. Loeb quickly wooed Bernard McQuaid over to the Union Leader, and bought the Sunday News outright in 1948. With no other statewide media (radio signals being blocked by mountains, and other papers only local to their towns), Loeb essentially gained a media monopoly in the state for himself. He tried, but failed, to win the license for the only television station licensed in the state, WMUR-TV.

Loeb's wife McAllister gave birth to a daughter, Katharine Penelope, on October 29, 1948.

In 1949, Loeb used the additional $300,000 from his mother and cash from various state politicians he endorsed to buy out Leonard Finder. Also in 1949, Loeb founded the Vermont Sunday News, largely a copy of the New Hampshire edition's content.

On August 5, 1949, Loeb took Nackey Gallowhur to meet his mother in New York City. There, George Gallowhur, Nackey's husband, attempted to serve her divorce papers. Loeb refused to permit Gallowhur's agents from serving her, and he was jailed briefly for interfering. Gallowhur sued Loeb for alienation of affection in accordance with an old Vermont law. Mrs. Loeb, infuriated at her son's mistreatment of Eleanore, excluded Bill from her will and sued him for the one million dollars in funding he obtained from her to finance his acquisitions of the Union Leader in 1946 and 1949.

Also in 1949, Loeb became the third president of American China Policy Association (ACPA), an anti-communist organization that supported the government of Republic of China under Chiang Kai-shek.

Later life
Loeb continued to see Nackey. In 1949, he fired the print staff at his Vermont newspapers when they attempted to unionize. Nackey was initially placed in charge of printing, but the couple left the state in 1952 in the wake of his mother's lawsuit, and moved to Reno, Nevada, where Loeb sued for divorce from McAllister and then married Nackey Gallowhur. The Vermont papers flailed in the absence of Loeb's attention, and also suffered from negative reader and advertiser reaction to his opinionated absentee editorials. The Daily News ceased operations in 1959. Loeb did not visit the St. Albans paper offices again until 1973.

In 1950, Loeb repeated his baptismal certificate stunt, this time on the Union Leader front page. He again hoped to dispel gossip about his Jewish heritage, this time in the wake of controversy surrounding his political endorsements.

Loeb moved to Pride's Crossing outside Beverly, Massachusetts, in 1955 to be closer to his New England newspaper operations. In 1957, he attempted to launch a paper in nearby Haverhill, the Haverhill Journal, but the publication proved to be a drain on the staff and presses shared with his other newspapers. The Journal folded in 1965, and Loeb blamed union activity for the closure. During a newspaper strike in Boston, he imported copies of the Union Leader into the city, but stopped after incorrect sports information in the publication led to threats from figures in the city's crime world. Loeb purchased the rights to the Connecticut Sunday Herald name (but not its presses), and relaunched it from Bridgeport, Connecticut, but once again his editorial stances alienated readers, and the paper closed.

Loeb's mother, Katherine Dorr-Loeb, died on November 24, 1966. Her will acknowledged Loeb's siblings, ex-wife Eleanore McAllister, and his daughter Katharine Penelope, but left him nothing. He filed suit, beginning a five-year legal battle that lasted through 1973 and rose to the Vermont Supreme Court, claiming that he had reconciled with his mother and that she had promised him 75 percent of her estate. He settled for less than 10 percent, after her estate had been drained of the bulk of its funds through his legal maneuvering. Loeb separated himself from Eleanore and Katharine Penelope. When his daughter suffered a near-fatal injury in an equestrian accident the next year and lost a kidney, Loeb refused to speak to her.

Loeb's journalism résumé was the subject of skepticism in 1974, when he claimed in a front-page editorial to have worked for the Hearst conglomerate, as a reporter for the New York World for eight years before buying his St. Albans paper. Hearst Corporation denied he had ever been employed there, and the World had actually ceased operations eight years before Loeb said he had started work there. Toledo Blade chairman Paul Block Jr. also denied ever seeing Loeb on the assignments he claimed to have worked.

William Loeb died in 1981 and left control of the Union Leader to his wife, Nackey. She suffered partial paralysis in a 1977 automobile accident, but continued to publish the paper until her death in 2000, when control fell to Bernard McQuaid's son, Joseph McQuaid. The Union Leader now operates several weekly community papers under the Neighborhood News, Inc. name in southern New Hampshire, the New Hampshire Mirror, a biweekly women's magazine, and the NewHampshire.Com website.

Legacy
On May 1, 2022, Loeb's stepdaughter accused him of sexually molesting her when she was 7 years old. The Union Leader denounced Loeb and removed his name from their masthead in response to the accusations.

Loeb is best known for his unyielding conservatism.  The Union Leader already tilted Republican editorially when he bought it, but veered sharply to the right after his purchase.  Since then, the paper has been one of the most conservative newspapers in the nation.

Loeb is best remembered nationally for his alleged role in attacking Edmund Muskie through The Union Leader in what is known locally as the Canuck letter, derailing the Maine senator's 1972 presidential bid. Loeb is said to have helped in the forgery and publication of the letter in the paper's op-ed section. The letter slandered French-Canadians, and implied Muskie was prejudiced against them. Muskie's emotional defense of himself in front of the Union Leader offices in Manchester was seen as a sign of weakness and instability. Muskie later claimed that there were not tears in his eyes, as many papers reported, but rather snowflakes (as it had been snowing that evening).

Loeb also gained infamy in the 1970s for attacking then-governor Walter R. Peterson Jr.'s teenage daughter for allegedly advocating the use of marijuana. She suffered an emotional breakdown as a result of the stress and public scrutiny thrust upon her in the wake of the allegations. Loeb was instrumental in the victory of Meldrim Thomson Jr., in the next gubernatorial election, and remained a political ally of Thomson's until Loeb's death.

William and Nackey had one daughter, Edith Roosevelt Loeb-Tomasko. Nackey and George Gallowhur had a daughter from their marriage, Nackey E. Gallowhur-Scagliotti. Both daughters operate the Nackey S. Loeb School of Communications.

Author Kevin Cash published a biography of Loeb entitled Who the Hell IS William Loeb? in 1975. Loeb's legal threats forced Cash to create his own publishing company, incorporated in Delaware, out of Loeb's reach. After four New Hampshire publishers balked at printing it, Cash had the book printed in Vermont.

In New Hampshire, his major legacy is an anti-tax pledge that has been taken not only
by all Republicans seeking gubernatorial nomination, but all Democrats who have successfully been elected.

Loeb did not hesitate to castigate fellow Republicans, once writing: "This newspaper now solemnly charges that President Eisenhower has done more to destroy the respect, honor and power of the United States than any President in its history." (Editorial, "Prince Of Appeasement," June 23, 1955, referring to the Austrian Treaty that allowed the Soviet Union to continue influence over Austria.) Loeb also stood alone among conservatives in his staunch support for Jimmy Hoffa, despite otherwise being a foe of labor.

References

Gfroerer, John. Powerful as Truth: William Loeb and 35 Years of New Hampshire. Concord [N.H.]: Accompany Video,  2001.
Veblen, Eric. The Manchester Union Leader in New Hampshire Elections. New York: HarperCollins, 1975.

External links
Biography
Time Magazine: Loeb Blow, 1/12/1976
Nackey S. Loeb School of Communications
Accompany Video, producers of "Powerful as Truth"
Family Tree of Nackey Scripps Gallowhur Loeb

People from Manchester, New Hampshire
Hotchkiss School alumni
Williams College alumni
1905 births
1981 deaths
New Hampshire Republicans
Massachusetts Republicans
Old Right (United States)
Nevada Republicans
20th-century American newspaper publishers (people)